Ayana is a name known in several unrelated languages around the world, such as Japanese, Turkic and Oromo.

Japanese 
 is a feminine Japanese given name which can be written using different kanji with different meanings:
 彩菜, "colorful, greens"
 彩那, "colorful, what"
 彩名, "colorful, name"
 綾奈, "design, what"
 朱菜, "vermilion, greens"

The name can also be written in either hiragana or katakana.

People
 , Japanese singer-songwriter
 Ayana Holloway Arce, American physicist
 Ayana V. Jackson (born 1977), American photographer and filmmaker
 Ayana Elizabeth Johnson, American marine biologist
 , Japanese freestyle skier
 , Japanese actress
 , Japanese-Indonesian singer
 Ayana Siriwardhana (born 1999), Sri Lankan cricketer
 , Japanese voice actress
 , Japanese transgender TV personality
 Ayana Walker (born 1979), American basketball player
 Ayana Zholdas (born 2001), Kazakhstani freestyle skier
 Dawud Ibsa Ayana (born 1952), Ethiopian political figure and militant

See also
 Ayanna, a given name

Japanese feminine given names